Urosaurus nigricauda is a species of lizard. Common names for this species include the Baja California brush lizard, black-tailed brush lizard, and small-scaled tree lizard. Its range includes southern California, Baja California, and nearby Pacific islands.

Taxonomy
Until 1999, the small-scaled lizard, Urosaurus microscutata, was considered a discrete species. U. microscutata has since been identified as the same species, and a synonym of U. nigricauda.

References 

Urosaurus
Reptiles of Mexico
Reptiles of the United States
Reptiles described in 1864
Taxa named by Edward Drinker Cope
Taxobox binomials not recognized by IUCN